Oleg Konstantinovich Komov (16 July 1932 – 3 September 1994) was a prominent Soviet-Russian sculptor and graphics artist.

Biography 
Oleg Komov was born on 16 July 1932 in Moscow.

1948–1953 studied at Moscow Art School in memory of 1905.

1953–1959 studied at Surikov Art Institute by Nikolai Tomsky.

Since 1959 member and since 1968 member of the directorial board of Artists' Union of the USSR.

Since 1962 member of CPSU.

Since 1975 associate, 1988 member and member of the directorial board of Academy of Arts of the USSR (Imperial Academy of Arts)

Since 1992 professor of sculpture at Surikov Art Institute.

Died on 3 September 1994, buried in Kuntsevo Cemetery in Moscow.

Work 

Up to 1970s Komov mostly created indoor sculpture works.

Starting from mid-1970s Komov created dozens of monuments in Moscow and other places in the USSR to prominent Russian artists, politicians and historical figures.

Komov's works usually have laconic forms and chamber scale. His monuments also usually fit the architectural and historical context where they were placed. Persons depicted in his monuments typically have details or items relating the person to their historical context.

Awards 
 People's Artist of the USSR (1987)
 People's Artist of the RSFSR (1976)
 Honoured Artist of the RSFSR (1970)
 USSR State Prize (1981) – for Alexey Venetsianov monument in Vyshny Volochyok
 Государственная премия РСФСР имени И. Е. Репина (1974) – for Pushkin monuments
 Премия имени Дж. Неру (1988)

Works (selected)

Links 
 Komov's sculpture "Glass", 1958 in Tretyakov Gallery in Moscow 
 Komov's monument to Minin in Nizhniy Novgorod on a 2002 Russian post stamp 
 "Soviet sculptor Oleg Komov" on soviet-art.ru
 Komov's biography at RusArtNet
 Komov's monuments to Russian writers and musicians on RussianLandmarks  
 Komov's sculptures at ILoveFigireSculpture
 Savva Yamshchikov Олег Комов: «Моя жизнь – творчество» (Вспоминая русского мастера)
 Морозов В. Ваятель. // Наш современник. – 2003. – № 4.
 Скульптор Олег Комов. Радио Маяк, 2003
 Культпоход № 2
 Энциклопедия Кирилла и Мефодия
 Культурное наследие земли Смоленской
 Ему помогало небо. Выставка в Академии хуожеств
 О чём рассказывает банкнота. Наука и жизнь, № 12, 2008
 Сполна ли отдана земная дань… Олегу Комову исполнилось бы 70 лет
 ПУШКИНИАНА. О выставке в Государственном музее А. С. Пушкина (на Арбате)
 Скульптурные портреты А. С. Пушкина
 Достопримечательности Москвы, Сущёвский дворик
 Могила Олега Комова на Новокунцевском кладбище
 Ирина Лобанова. Народный художник РСФСР, член-корреспондент Академии художеств СССР Олег Комов: «Открыть новое» // Смена, No.1408, Январь 1986
 Алексей Касмынин. Комов навсегда (о Вечере памяти О. К. Комова в Библиотеке им. А. Ф. Лосева на Арбате) // Завтра, декабрь, 2010.

1932 births
Soviet sculptors
1994 deaths
Artists from Moscow
20th-century Russian sculptors
20th-century Russian male artists
Russian male sculptors